Thomas Jenkins (June 28, 1832 – August 15, 1911) was a member of the Wisconsin State Assembly.

Jenkins was born on June 28, 1832 in Cornwall, England. He settled in Platteville, Wisconsin, where he served as postmaster. He was also a member of the state board of normal school regents.

References

External links

Politicians from Cornwall
English emigrants to the United States
People from Platteville, Wisconsin
Democratic Party members of the Wisconsin State Assembly
1832 births
1911 deaths